Lee Kyu-hyuk may refer to:
 Lee Kyou-hyuk, South Korean speed skater
 Lee Kyu-hyuk (footballer)